The  Denver Dynamite season was the first season for the Denver Dynamite. Businessman and owner of the Denver Nuggets, Sidney Shlenker announced the forming of the Denver Dynamite. The franchise played in the inaugural four-team "demonstration" season of 1987. Despite the team and league's doubters, the Dynamite tied for the best record in the league with the Pittsburgh Gladiators, going 4–2. On August 1, 1987, the team participated in ArenaBowl I, which they won 45–16 over the Gladiators. The Dynamite were led on offense by quarterback Whit Taylor, and wide receiver Gary Mullen (Mullen won ArenaBowl I MVP). After winning the ArenaBowl, Head Coach Tim Marcum was named the league's first ever Coach of the Year. After leading the Dynamite to the Despite averaging the league's best attendance with over 12,000 a game, it did not return for the league's second season due to Shlenker refusing to abide by the AFL's financial rules.

Regular season

Schedule

Standings

y – clinched regular-season title

x – clinched playoff spot

Playoffs

Roster

Stats

Offense

Quarterback

Running backs

Wide receivers

Defense

Special teams

Kick return

Kicking

Awards

References

External links
 1987 Denver Dynamite page at ArenaFan.com

Denver Dynamite
Denver Dynamite
Denver Dynamite (arena football) seasons
ArenaBowl champion seasons